James Spencer or Jim Spencer, or similar, may refer to:

Sportspeople 
James Spencer (footballer, born 1985), English football player
James Spencer (cross-country skier) (born 1936), British Olympic skier
Jim Spencer (1946–2002), American baseball player
Jim Spencer (American football) (1901–1961), American football player
Jim Spencer (curler), Canadian curler
Jimmy Spencer (American football) (born 1969), American football player
Jimmy Spencer (footballer) (born 1991), English footballer
Jimmy Spencer (racing driver) (born 1957), American racing car driver
Jamie Spencer (born 1980), Irish flat racing jockey

Other people 
James B. Spencer (1781–1848), U.S. Representative from New York
James G. Spencer (1844–1926), U.S. Representative from Mississippi
James R. Spencer (born 1949), American jurist
Jim Spencer (CEO), American media entrepreneur
James Spencer-Churchill, 12th Duke of Marlborough (born 1955)
Sir James Ernest Spencer (1848–1937), British Member of Parliament
James Spencer, Lord Mayor of London in 1527